GTFC may refer to:
 Gainsborough Trinity F.C.
 Garforth Town F.C.
 Gedling Town F.C.
 Gillingham Town F.C.
 Glastonbury Town F.C.
 Godalming Town F.C.
 Grantham Town F.C.
 Grimsby Town F.C.
 Guisborough Town F.C.
 Guna Trading F.C.
 Sucrose—1,6-alpha-glucan 3(6)-alpha-glucosyltransferase, an enzyme